The Seetee series is a golden age science fiction cycle by the American writer Jack Williamson (writing under the pseudonym "Will Stewart.") It follows late-22nd century Asteroid Belt colonists in an attempt to harness the titular seetee (a phonetic for "CT" or "contraterrene" matter, an obsolete term for antimatter), both for the advancement of humanity and the defeat of the undemocratic authority of the High Space Mandate.

Publication History
All the series' individual entries were originally published as short story-length installments in Astounding Science Fiction magazine:

 Collision Orbit (short story, July 1942)
 Minus Sign (short story, November 1942)
 Opposites—React! (novelette, serialized January–February 1943)
 Seetee Shock (novel, serialized February–April 1949)
 Seetee Ship (novel, 1951, fixup of Minus Sign and Opposites—React!)
 Beyond Mars (comic strip, 1952–1955)

The first three stories were published in an eight-month period straddling 1942 and 1943. After a six-year hiatus, Williamson revisited the setting with "Seetee Shock," a novel-length story serialized  in Astounding between February and April 1949. The second and third stories were subsequently combined into a fix-up novel, released as Seetee Ship in 1951 by Gnome Press in an edition of 4,000 copies, and had subsequent reprintings from several publishers, including a Lancer omnibus edition in 1972. (The first story in the series, "Collision Orbit," was not collected in either of the Gnome Press books, or in any later omnibus editions.)

The stories' internal chronological order is identical to their order of publication, save for the 1951 fix-up Seetee Ship,  which is set before Seetee Shock (1949), the first part of the series to be published in book form.

While directly based on the Seetee series, with a very similar setting, characters, and technology base, the 1952 comic strip Beyond Mars did not share the same continuity; the strip's departures included Mars and Venus being home to intelligent alien races, and neither solar-system politics nor antimatter played major parts in the story.

Setting
In the late 22nd century, many asteroids had been made habitable decades ago by "asterites" or Belt colonists through the use of paragravity technology. They are currently governed by the High Space Mandate, a joint multilateral administration run for the benefit of - the major planets of the solar system. The four constituent powers of the Mandate are the Earth-Moon Union (which is apparently American-dominated), the Martian Reich, the Jovian Soviet, and an unnamed Chinese regime on Venus; the Earth-based Interplanet conglomerate, which holds a century-old uranium monopoly, is a de-facto fifth power, and largely controls the government of Earth. 

The Mandate, whose capital is located on the asteroid Pallas, had been established in 2171 by the peace treaty concluding a nearly ten-year war started by the Martian Reich, which saw all of Earth's colonies except the Moon gain independence. The more moderate Venusians and Jovians had invited Earth to join the post-war Mandate to counterbalance hard-line Martian influence, but the asterites - despite having fought on the rebel side in the hope of establishing their own independent High Space Union - were betrayed by their former allies at the conclusion of the war.

Plot
Collision Orbit, published in the July 1942 issue of Astounding, begins in early 2191 on the sleepy colonized asteroid Obania, which is suddenly endangered by a smaller asteroid after a random collision with a seetee body alters its orbit. "Spatial engineer" Jim Drake, tugboat pilot Rob McGee, and young heiress Ann O'Banion try to divert the asteroid - which they name Freedonia -  which would enable them to claim it in recompense and use it as a laboratory for Drake's seetee experimentation. The attempt to install a paragravity engine at the center of Freedonia fails due to bad luck and economic sabotage by Mandate authorities, but in the end Drake succeeds by steering a mass of anti-iron into a borehole, where the resultant matter-antimatter reaction can function as an improvised rocket. The Mandate reluctantly recognizes Drake's claim, and his son Rick - inspired by his father's success and angered by the Mandate's unfairness - joins the family business.

"Minus Sign" (in the November 1942 issue) begins immediately after the conclusion of the preceding story in March 2191, but switches viewpoints to Rick Drake, also a spatial engineer and a rising star with Interplanet. Angered and disillusioned by the Mandate's treatment of his father, he joints Drake, McGee and Drake as a partner, but the venture is immediately in danger of losing Freedonia due to an inflated tax assessment. Rick Drake and Rob McGee set out to visit a mysterious asteroid exhibiting anomalous properties that has just been accelerated by to solar escape velocity by a seetee collision. The voyage becomes a race against a Mandate science expedition commanded by the affable, cooly-superior Paul Anders, but upon arrival at the nameless asteroid the two ships experience strange phenomena, and an unidentified warship exchanges fire with the Mandate cruiser. McGee eventually figures out that the asteroid - while composed of normal matter - hails from a region of the universe where the arrow of time is reversed, and that they are being carried into the past as long they remain within its proximity. Drake and McGee escape the asteroid just before its yet-to-happen collision with the seetee body, salvaging a large amount of mined industrial diamonds and the survivors of the Mandate cruiser, which had been destroyed in a battle with its earlier self.

In Opposites—React! (two installments in January and February 1943), a contraterrene alien artifact is discovered, and competing parties race to reach it and learn its secrets.  The plot of the later book version differs somewhat from the magazine version, particularly in incorporating the speculation that time might run backwards in the neighborhood of a contraterrene object.

Reviews
Groff Conklin gave Seetee Ship a mixed review, finding it "a good story if you can bear ploughing through pages of literary corn starch." P. Schuyler Miller noted that Williamson's rewrite of the stories into a more cohesive novel was "an excellent job of unification." New York Times reviewer Villiers Gersen, however, commented that "it is a pity that the quality of Stewart's writing . . . ranks only slightly above that of a comic-strip adventure."

"Terraforming"
The word "terraforming" was a neologism coined in Collision Orbit, although the concept itself had been suggested previously. Willliamson's definition of the term in the story differs significantly from the concept's later development; he applied it to a process for creating a shirt-sleeve environment on very small asteroids, by installing a fictional "paragravity" unit at their centers, thereby endowing them with Earth-level gravity and making them capable of retaining a breathable atmosphere.

During the 1980s, American geographer Richard Cathcart successfully lobbied for formal recognition of the verb "to terraform." The word was added to the fourth edition of the Shorter Oxford English Dictionary in 1993.

See also
Terraforming in popular culture

References

Sources
ISFDB listing: Seetee Ship

1951 short story collections
Science fiction short story collections
Fiction about asteroid mining
Gnome Press books
Science fiction short stories
1942 short stories